Contained in Hart Crane's first collection of poems, White Buildings (1926), "Voyages" was composed across six years (1921–1926), with sections published as early as 1923. Containing one of Crane's most famous lyrics, "Voyages: II," this love-cycle of six poems was largely fueled by his reciprocated relationship with Emil Opffer, a Danish merchant mariner.

External links
 Full text of "Voyages" at HathiTrust Digital Library
 "Voyages: II" at Poets.org
 Brian Reedon on Voyages (at Poetry Foundation)

1926 poems
American poems